Vadgam is located in India, situated in Banaskantha district in northern Gujarat. Administratively, it is a Taluka. There are 110 villages under this Taluka. Vadgam region also known as a Dhandhar.

Geography

Vadgam is situated between Kheralu and Palanpur, 15 km away from Palanpur the main city of the Banaskantha District. It is a commercial place for the surrounding the villages Memadpur, Kodaram, Pilucha, Rupal, Gola, Parakhadi, Magarwada, Nandotra, Majadar, Gidasan and Nanosana. average raindrop  in vadgam region is 706mm.

History
During the British Raj Vadgam was the capital of Wadagam State, one of the princely states of the Mahi Kantha Agency ruled by Rajputs.

Nearby places of interest
 Ambaji: 50 km
Palanpur : 16km

References

External links
Vadgam Website

Villages in Banaskantha district